Chatters is a surname. Notable people with the surname include:

David Chatters (1946–2016), Canadian politician
James Chatters (born 1949), American forensic anthropologist, archaeologist, and paleontologist

See also
Chatter (disambiguation)